Goreangab Dam is a dam in the north-western suburbs of Windhoek, the capital of Namibia. It dams the ephemeral Arebbusch River and its tributary, the Gammams River, which both run across Windhoek.

References

Dams in Namibia
Dams completed in 1958
1958 establishments in South West Africa
Buildings and structures in Windhoek